John B. Judis is an author and American journalist, an editor-at-large at Talking Points Memo, a former senior writer at the National Journal  and a former senior editor at The New Republic.

Education

Judis was born in Chicago to a family of Jewish heritage. He attended Amherst College and received B.A. and M.A. degrees in Philosophy from the University of California at Berkeley.

Career

Judis has been a life long democratic socialist.  In 1986, while debating the Objectivist philosopher Harry Binswanger, a disciple of Ayn Rand, in a televised debate "Socialism vs. Capitalism," Judis laid out his version of socialism as being the inevitable socioeconomic arrangement of a post-capitalist society, where highly educated and industrialized societies would invariably transform into social democracies with mixed-market economies, personal property rights and independent small and medium enterprises, with state intervention to regulate problems of capitalism and alleviate suffering, a view shared by many modern sociologists, including Wolfgang Streeck, and those of the mid-20th century Progressives.  This vision defined all of Judis' work as an author, and is declared as prophetic by the author himself in his The Socialist Awakening, published in 2020.

In 1969 he was a founding editor of Socialist Revolution (which was later renamed Socialist Review and then Radical Society before ceasing publication in 2009). In the 1970s he was a founding editor of the East Bay Voice. He moved to Chicago in December 1976 to become the foreign editor of In These Times, a democratic socialist newsweekly.  Judis moved to Washington  in 1982. He started writing for The New Republic in 1984, became a contributing editor in 1989, and joined the regular staff in 1995.  He quit in December 2014 along with other editors in protest of the owner Chris Hughes' firing of the editor and plan to turn the magazine into a profit-making vehicle.

He has also written for GQ, Foreign Affairs, Mother Jones, The New York Times Magazine, and The Washington Post.

In 1988, he published a biography, William F. Buckley: Patron Saint of the Conservatives; in 1992, Grand Illusion: Critics and Champions of the American Century; in 2000, The Paradox of American Democracy.  In 2002, he published The Emerging Democratic Majority (co-written with political scientist Ruy Teixeira), a book arguing that Democrats would retake control of American politics by the end of the decade, thanks in part to growing support from minorities, women, and well-educated professionals. Its title was a deliberate echo of Kevin Phillips' 1969 classic, The Emerging Republican Majority. The book was named one of the year's best by The Economist. Later in 2015, in an essay The Emerging Republican Advantage  he revised this view as he noted that the long term Democratic Majority had given way to an "unstable equilibrium" between the parties.

In 2004, he published "The Folly of Empire: What George W. Bush could learn from Theodore Roosevelt and Woodrow Wilson," an attempt to put the American invasion of Iraq in historical context. In 2014 he authored the book Genesis: Truman, American Jews, and the Origins of the Arab/Israeli Conflict in which he discussed the connection between the Israel lobby in the United States and the origin of the modern state of Israel. In 2016, he published The Populist Explosion: How the Great Recession Transformed American and European Politics. This book, which was widely reviewed, analyzed, among other things, the remarkable success of Bernie Sanders and Donald Trump. In 2018, he published The Nationalist Revival: Trade, Immigration, and the Revolt against Globalization, which attempted to explain the rise of nationalist parties and candidates, including Donald Trump.  In September 2020, Judis published The Socialist Awakening. In 2021, The Politics of Our Time was published.

Bibliography 
William F. Buckley, Jr.: Patron Saint of the Conservatives (1988)
Grand Illusion: Critics and Champions of the American Century (1992)
The Paradox of American Democracy: Elites, Special Interests, and the Betrayal of the Public Trust (2000)
The Emerging Democratic Majority (with Ruy Teixeira) (2002)
The Folly of Empire : What George W. Bush Could Learn from Theodore Roosevelt and Woodrow Wilson (2004)
Genesis: Truman, American Jews, and the Origins of the Arab/Israeli Conflict (2014)
The Populist Explosion: How the Great Recession Transformed American and European Politics (2016) 
The Nationalist Revival: Trade, Immigration, and the Revolt against Globalization (2018)
The Socialist Awakening: What's Different Now about the Left (2020)
The Politics of Our Time: Populism, Nationalism, Socialism (2021)

References

External links
TNR biography

TNR article: For a New Nationalism, by Judis and Michael Lind 
Trotskyism to Anachronism: The Neoconservative Revolution, by John B. Judis (Foreign Affairs, 1995 )
Video (and audio) of conversation with John Judis and David Frum on Bloggingheads.tv
John Judis interviewed about his book, Genesis: Truman, American Jews, and the Origins of the Arab-Israeli Conflict (audio here)

American male journalists
Amherst College alumni
American political writers
American biographers
Populism scholars
American male biographers
University of California, Berkeley alumni
Year of birth missing (living people)
Living people
The New Republic people
Carnegie Council for Ethics in International Affairs